The Nokia N96 is a discontinued high-end smartphone announced by Nokia on 11 February 2008 at the Mobile World Congress in Barcelona as part of the Nseries line. The N96 runs Symbian OS v9.3 (S60 3rd Edition, FP2). It is compatible with the N-Gage 2.0 gaming platform and has a DVB-H TV tuner and AV output.

Compared to the popular Nokia N95 8GB, the N96 has a doubled flash storage capacity (16 GB), dual LED flashes and a slimmer design. However, critics had negative views on the N96's battery life and user-unfriendliness and its downgraded CPU clock speed raised questions. It was one of 2008's most anticipated mobile phones, but its launch was delayed and it was only widely available from October 2008. It is thus considered a commercial failure. Critics stated that the Nokia N85 provided more new features at a significantly lower price.

Release
Shipments for the N96 began in September 2008. Europe, Middle East and Asia-Pacific were the first locations to provide the phone to consumers. The American and Chinese versions were expected shortly thereafter. In the US, the phone was sold for $900, which was seen as being too expensive. The general UK release date for the N96 was 1 October, although London had a separate date of 24 September, where the phone went on sale exclusively at Nokia's flagship stores on Regent Street and at Terminal 5 of Heathrow Airport.

Differences from N95 8GB
Additions:
 Dual-LED camera flash (single LED in N95 8GB)
 New audio DSP
 Longer music playback time (14 hrs) and video playback time (6 hrs)
 Windows Media WMV9 video codec
 Hardware acceleration for H.264 and WMV video codecs
 DVB-H 1.0 receiver built in – only usable with paid subscription
 Flip-out stand for more comfortable viewing of content when placed on a flat surface (surrounds the lens assembly)
 S60 3rd Edition upgraded from Feature Pack 1 to Feature Pack 2
 linu v88.0.12.0
 Java ME engine upgraded from MIDP 2.0 to MIDP 2.1
 User data preserved when upgrading firmware - this feature is also present on the N95-2 as v21 installs UDP base files
 Open C/C++ support
 New QuickOffice application - opens all Microsoft Office files
 New version of Nokia Video Centre (show & edit videos)
 New release of Nokia Experience software
 2.0 Hi-Speed microUSB (write 3 Mbit/s, read 4.1 Mbit/s) –  N95 8GB uses full-speed USB
 microSD memory card slot - as in original N95, while  N95 8GB has no card slot
 RSS 2.1 reader
 FM radio with RDS
 Dual-band HSDPA (900 and 2100 MHz) - N95 supports 2100 MHz only
 No need to open slider for optimal GPS reception
 VGA front camera - N95 8GB has CIF front camera
 Video Flash lightguns
 Upgraded Bluetooth stereo audio
 FOTA (Firmware Over the Air)
 OMA E-mail Notification v1.0
 OMA Device Management v1.2
 OpenGL ES 1.1 plugin
 Dual Transfer Mode (MSC 11)
 SPP Bluetooth profiles

Removals:
 Free sat-nav service – Nokia advised that this was in the pipeline and that they fully expected it to be made available, but did not say when it would be available
 Support for Nokia Music Headset HS-45, AD-54
 CPU: N96 has dual ARM9 264 MHz with no floating point instructions, N95 has dual ARM11 332 MHz with vector floating point
 N96 has 8x image digital zoom and 4x video digital zoom while N95 has 20x image digital zoom and 8x video digital zoom, although the benefits of this are debatable
 Same battery as original N95 (950 mAh), but reportedly has a much better battery life due to software improvements under Feature Pack 2 - Nokia N95 8GB has 1200 mAh battery
 No hardware 3D graphics accelerator
 No infrared port
 N95 has a lens cover and a high-quality shutter (both the N95 8GB and N96 do not have this feature)
 No manually selected MMS messaging mode. If the user write a long text message, the N96 will automatically select the MMS mode which could stop recipients from receiving the message if they do not have MMS set up on their phones. A Nokia USA employee stated that there was an update in the works to fix this very soon. It is assumed that this automatic selection of MMS mode is due to Nokia's Connectivity.
 The built-in VoIP client from N95 which allowed the user to make Internet calls without installing any additional software was removed from N96. Nevertheless, the VoIP 2.1 API still exists which can be used by software developers in their applications.
 The pencil key used to mark and unmark items and highlight text is not included, but this action can still be done by holding down the # key.

In popular culture
The N96 appears in Katy Perry's 'Hot n Cold' music video.

See also
Nokia N85
Sony Ericsson W995
Sony Ericsson C905
Samsung i8510 Innov8

References

External links
 Original Press Release, Americas Press Release
 N96 specifications from Nokia Europe
 N96 Drivers and Support from Nokia Europe

N-Gage (service) compatible devices
Mobile phones introduced in 2008
Nokia Nseries
Slider phones